Axel Pinto (born 18 September 2000) is an Argentine professional footballer who plays as a midfielder for Central Córdoba.

Career
Pinto's career began with Central Córdoba in 2015. Gustavo Coleoni moved him into the seniors during the 2018–19 campaign, appearing as a second-half substitute in a draw with Agropecuario on 23 February 2019. The club won promotion to the Primera División at the end of his first campaign.

Career statistics
.

References

External links

2000 births
Living people
People from Santiago del Estero
Argentine footballers
Association football midfielders
Primera Nacional players
Argentine Primera División players
Central Córdoba de Santiago del Estero footballers
Sportspeople from Santiago del Estero Province